The 2018 Basque Pelota World Championships were the 18th edition of the Basque Pelota World Championships organized by  the FIPV.

Participating nations

 (10)
 (4)
 (1)
 (7)
 (11)
 (2)
 (14)
 (1)
 (1)
 (12)
 (2)
 (14)
 (5)
 (8)

Events
A total of 14 events were disputed, in 4 playing areas.

Trinquete, 5 events disputed

Fronton (30 m), 4 events disputed

Fronton (36 m), 4 events disputed

Fronton (54 m), 1 event disputed

Medal table

References

World Championships,2018
2018 in sports
International sports competitions hosted by Spain
World Championships,2018
World Championships